The Lithuania national baseball team is the national baseball team of Lithuania. The team currently competes in the Pool B of the European Baseball Championship.

History 
Baseball was introduced in Lithuania by Lithuanian American pilot Steponas Darius in 1922, after returning from the United States.

The team played in the 2019 European Baseball Championship - B-Pool in early July 2019 in Trnava, Slovakia, winning its group and advancing to the playoffs against Israel in the 2019 Playoff Series at the end of July 2019 for the last qualifying spot for the 2019 European Baseball Championship.

Israel won the first two games in a best-of-three series against Lithuania in Utena.

Roster
Lithuania's roster for the European Baseball Championship Qualifier 2022, the last official competition in which the team took part.

Tournament results
European Youth Baseball Championship
 2008 : 8th

European Cadet Baseball Championship
 2013 : 5th
 2014 : 4th

European Juveniles Baseball Championship
 2007 : 4th
 2008 : 5th
 2009 : 5th
 2010 : 3rd
 2011 : 4th
 2012 : 3rd
 2013 : 2nd
 2014 : 4th

European Junior Baseball Championship
 2011 : 10th

European Under-21 Baseball Championship
 2012 : 8th
 2014 : 6th
 2016 : 

World University Baseball Championship
 2008 : 7th

12U Baseball World Championship
2011 : 13th

15U Baseball World Cup
 2012 : 14th
 2014 : 18th

References 

Baseball
National baseball teams in Europe
Baseball in Lithuania